Bengt Calmeyer (born 3 October 1932) is a Norwegian journalist and novelist. He was born in Oslo, and is a brother of actor Joachim Calmeyer. He was assigned with the newspaper Arbeiderbladet from 1959, where he was a foreign correspondent in London from 1965, and later cultural editor. His books include NRK – myter og virkelighet from 1977 and Forsinket oppgjør: arbeiderbevegelsen og den politiske overvåking from 1993. He has written the crime novels Åpen grav (1967) and De hemmelige døde (1968), where the detective is a freelance journalist. Later fictional works include the trilogy Mennesker from 1997, Vitner from 1999 and Spor from 2000.

References

1932 births
Living people
Writers from Oslo
Norwegian journalists
Norwegian expatriates in the United Kingdom
Norwegian male novelists
20th-century Norwegian novelists
21st-century Norwegian novelists
20th-century Norwegian male writers
21st-century Norwegian male writers